Nicholas III served as Greek Patriarch of Alexandria between 1389 and 1398.

References

14th-century Patriarchs of Alexandria